DC circuit may refer to:
Direct current circuit
United States Court of Appeals for the District of Columbia Circuit, a current federal appellate court
United States Circuit Court of the District of Columbia, a former federal court that existed from 1801 to 1863